Gorica pri Dobjem is a small settlement in the Municipality of Dobje in eastern Slovenia. The area is part of the traditional region of Styria. It is now included with the rest of the municipality in the Savinja Statistical Region.

Name
The name of the settlement was changed from Gorica to Gorica pri Dobjem in 1953.

Cultural heritage
A small chapel in the settlement dates to 1860.

References

External links
Gorica pri Dobjem on Geopedia

Populated places in the Municipality of Dobje